Jerome Feudjio (born September 30, 1955) is a Cameroonian prelate of the Catholic Church who has been serving as the bishop of the Diocese of Saint Thomas in the United States Virgin Islands since 2021.

Biography

Early life 
Born on September 30, 1955, in Nkongsamba, Cameroon, Jerome Feudjio graduated in 1967 from St. Albert Catholic School in Dschang, Cameroon. In 1968, he started attending St. John College of the Christian Brothers of Quebec in Mbanga, Cameroon, receiving a degree in bookkeeping in 1972.

After graduating from college, Feudjio became a postulant for the Priests of the Sacred Heart. In 1972, he starting attending Saint Apostles Seminary of the Fathers of the Sacred Heart in Otelé,Cameroon. In 1975, Feudjio went to the Major Seminary of Nkolbison in Yaoundé, Cameroon, finishing there in 1979.

In 1980, while on a visit to Washington, D.C, Feudjio was introduced to then-Father Sean O'Malley. O'Malley invited him to remain in Washington and stay at San Francisco House, run by the Spanish Catholic Center of the Archdiocese of Washington. Feudjio attended Oblate College at Washington Theological Consortium, completing studies in Philosophy and Theology for the priesthood. In 1987, he joined the Oblates of Mary Immaculate and made his temporary religious profession.

Moving to Carbondale, Illinois, Feudjio enrolled in the Administration of Justice Program at Southern Illinois University. He completed the program with an internship at a local transitional house. In 1988, Feudjio started working as a campus minister at Sts. Peter & Paul School in St. Thomas.

Priesthood 
On September 29, 1990, Feudjio was ordained to the priesthood for the Diocese of St. Thomas by then Bishop O'Malley. After his ordination, Feudjio was named as parochial vicar at Saints Peter and Paul Cathedral and Saint Anne's Chapel in Frenchtown, Saint Thomas. In 1992, he started teaching French and religion at Sts. Peter & Paul School; in 1995, he became assistant principal there. In 1996, Feudjio became the diocesan finance officer and director of vocations. In 1997, he left both of his school positions to become administrator of Saints Peter & Paul Cathedral. In 2000, Feudjio became rector of the Cathedral and in 2001 vicar for clergy and religious.

In 2002, Feudjio became chancellor for the diocese for two years. In 2002, Pope John Paul II named Feudjio a chaplain of his holiness. in 2004, he was assigned as pastor of Holy Family Parish in St. Thomas. In 2008, he was named rector and vicar general of the Saints Peter and Paul Cathedral.

Bishop 
On March 2, 2021, Pope Francis appointed Feudjio bishop for the Diocese of Saint Thomas. On April 17, 2021, Feudjio was consecrated as bishop at Saints Peter and Paul Cathedral in St. Thomas, US Virgin Islands.

See also

 Catholic Church hierarchy
 Catholic Church in the United States
 Historical list of the Catholic bishops of the United States
 List of Catholic bishops of the United States
 Lists of patriarchs, archbishops, and bishops

References

External links

 Roman Catholic Diocese of Saint Thomas Official Site

 

1955 births
Living people
People from Dschang
Cameroonian emigrants to the United States
Roman Catholic bishops of Saint Thomas
Bishops appointed by Pope Francis
Cameroonian religious leaders
Expatriate bishops